The Typhlopidae are a family of blind snakes. They are found mostly in the tropical regions of Africa, Asia, the Americas, and all mainland Australia and various islands. The rostral scale overhangs the mouth to form a shovel-like burrowing structure. They live underground in burrows, and since they have no use for vision, their eyes are mostly vestigial. They have light-detecting black eye spots, and teeth occur in the upper jaw. Typhlopids do not have dislocatable lower jaw articulations restricting them to prey smaller than their oral aperture. The tail ends with a horn-like scale. Most of these species are oviparous. Currently, 18 genera are recognized containing over 200 species.

Geographic range
They are found in most tropical and many subtropical regions all over the world, particularly in Africa, Asia, islands in the Pacific, tropical America, and southeastern Europe.

Fossil record 
Possible Typhlopid skin has been identified in Dominican amber.

Genera

TType genus

Former genera
Xenotyphlops, formerly classified in the Typhlopidae, is now classed in the Xenotyphlopidae.

See also
 List of typhlopid species and subspecies

References

External links

 

 
Snake families
Taxa named by Blasius Merrem